Wallback is an unincorporated community in Clay and Roane counties, West Virginia, United States. Wallback has a post office with ZIP code 25285.

The community is named for John de Barth Walbach, an Alsatian hussar of the French Revolutionary Wars who became an aide to Alexander Hamilton, rose to Adjutant General of the United States during the War of 1812, and was the oldest acting officer in U.S. history. Walbach inherited 10,000 acres on the Elk River from his father, Count Jean-Joseph de Barth, who led the "French 500"  fleeing the French Revolution and founding  Gallipolis, Ohio.

References

Unincorporated communities in Clay County, West Virginia
Unincorporated communities in Roane County, West Virginia
Unincorporated communities in West Virginia